is a city located in Tokushima Prefecture, Japan. , the city had an estimated population of 35,631 in 15432 households and a population density of 190 persons per km².

Geography
Awa is located in the northeastern part of Tokushima Prefecture, between the northern bank of the Yoshino River and Kagawa Prefecture. Parts of the city are within the borders of the Okumiyagawa-Uchidani Prefectural Natural Park.

Neighbouring municipalities 
Tokushima Prefecture
 Mima
 Yoshinogawa
 Kamiita
Kagawa Prefecture
 Sanuki
 Higashikagawa

Climate
Awa has a Humid subtropical climate (Köppen Cfa) characterized by warm summers and cool winters with light to no snowfall.  The average annual temperature in Awa is 14.9 °C. The average annual rainfall is 1,335 mm with September as the wettest month.

Demographics
Per Japanese census data, the population of Awa has slowly declined over the past 60 years.

History 
As with all of Tokushima Prefecture, the area of Awa was part of ancient Awa Province. The Yoshino River valley was settled since at least the Kofun period, and archaeologists have found many kofun burial mounds.  During the Edo period, the area was part of the holdings of Tokushima Domain ruled by the Hachisuka clan from their seat at Tokushima Castle. Following the Meiji restoration, it was organized into villages within Awa District and Itano District, Tokushima with the creation of the modern municipalities system on October 1, 1889. The villages of Hisakatsu, Isawa and Hayashi were founded within Awa District on October 1, 1889. Hayashi was raised to town status on November 1, 1928 and Hisakatsu on November 3, 1951. Hayashi, Hisakatsu and Isawa merged to form the town of Awa on March 31, 1955. The city of Awa was established on April 1, 2005, from the merger of the former town of Awa, absorbing the town of Ichiba from Awa District, and the towns of Donari and Yoshino (from Itano District).

Government
Awa has a mayor-council form of government with a directly elected mayor and a unicameral city council of 20 members. Awa contributes two members to the Tokushima Prefectural Assembly. In terms of national politics, the city is part of Tokushima 2nd district of the lower house of the Diet of Japan.

Economy
The economy of Awa is primarily agricultural.

Education
Awa has ten public elementary schools and four public middle schools operated by the city government and two public middle school and four public high schools operated by the Tokushima Prefectural Department of Education.

Transportation

Railway
Awa has no passenger railway service. Awa-Kawashima Station is closest to the city hall, Awa-Yamakawa Station is close to center of former Awa town, and Kamojima Station is closest to the center of both former Donari and Yoshino towns.

Highways 
  Tokushima Expressway

Local attractions
Jūraku-ji, 7th temple on the Shikoku Pilgrimage
Kumadani-ji, 8th temple on the Shikoku Pilgrimage
Hōrin-ji, 9th temple on the Shikoku Pilgrimage
Kirihata-ji, 10th temple on the Shikoku Pilgrimage
Awa-no-dochū. Natural Monument
Okumiyagawa-Uchidani Prefectural Natural Park

Noted people from Awa
Takeo Miki, Prime Minister of Japan 
Kazuo Sakamaki, Imperial Japanese Navy officer

References

External links

Awa City official website 
Awa Town website 

 
Cities in Tokushima Prefecture